"Back in Time" is a song by the American rapper Pitbull. While originally released as the lead single from the soundtrack of sci-fi film Men in Black 3, it is not featured on the album. Instead, it was released as the lead single from Pitbull's seventh studio album, Global Warming. The single was released via download on March 27, 2012, before being issued physically in Germany on May 25.

The song contains a sample from "Love Is Strange", written by Mickey Baker, Sylvia Robinson, and Ellas McDaniel, as performed by Mickey & Sylvia, which was also used in the song Rinky Dink by Bill Justis.
The single was a commercial success, peaking at number 11 on the US Billboard Hot 100. To date, it has sold over 1.3 million copies digitally in the US. The single was also successful outside of the US, peaking at number one in Austria, Honduras and Poland, and within the top ten in Australia, Belgium, Canada, France, Germany, Hungary, New Zealand and Switzerland.

Remixes of this song were released by R3hab, Play-N-Skillz, Quintino, Gregor Salto and Alvaro.

Music video
The music video begins with Pitbull in a locked room when a girl named Barbara Alba (his girlfriend) comes in and frees him. They have dinner at a restaurant (based on the scenes in the movie). Then, an alien attacks the restaurant and the girl shoots the alien with her gun and she and Pitbull leave the restaurant. Then, the video switches back and forth with Pitbull and his girlfriend at a party to the clips of the film. The video ends with Pitbull using the Neuralyzer to end the video with the sign "PIT/MIB". It is also available on the DVD and Blu-ray releases of the film. Madai also appeared in this video.

As of 2022, the video has received over 53 million views on YouTube.

Chart performance
The single debuted at number 79 on the US Billboard Hot 100, on the week of April 14, 2012. In the following week, the song fell off the chart. Two weeks later, the song re-entered the chart at number 83, on the week of April 28. After climbing the chart for seven more weeks, the single reached its peak at number 11 on the chart dated June 16. As of August 2012, the single had sold over 1.3 million copies digitally. On October 16, 2020, the single was certified double platinum by the Recording Industry Association of America (RIAA) for combined sales and streaming equivalent units of over two million units in the United States.

Track listing
 Download
 "Back in Time" – 3:27
 "Back in Time" (Single Version) – 3:25

 CD single
 "Back in Time" – 3:25
 "Back in Time" (Extended Mix) – 3:41

Charts

Weekly charts

Year-end charts

All-time charts

Certifications

Release history

References

External links
 

2012 singles
Pitbull (rapper) songs
Songs from Men in Black (franchise)
Songs written for films
RCA Records singles
Songs written by Pitbull (rapper)
Number-one singles in Austria
Number-one singles in Honduras
Number-one singles in Poland
Songs written by Bo Diddley
Songs written by Sylvia Robinson
Songs written by Marc Kinchen
2011 songs
Songs written by DJ Buddha
Song recordings produced by DJ Buddha